Irène Gijbels is a mathematical statistician at KU Leuven in Belgium, and an expert on nonparametric statistics.
She has also collaborated with TopSportLab, a KU Leuven spin-off, on software for risk assessment of sports injuries.

Education and career
Gijbels earned her Ph.D. in 1990 from Limburgs Universitair Centrum. Her dissertation, supervised by Noël Veraverbeke, was Asymptotic Representations under Random Censoring.

She joined KU Leuven after postdoctoral research as a Fulbright scholar at the University of North Carolina at Chapel Hill and the Mathematical Sciences Research Institute.

Book
With Jianqing Fan, Gijbels is the author of Local Polynomial Modelling and Its Applications (CRC Press, 1996).

Recognition
Gijbels is an elected member of the International Statistical Institute and the Royal Flemish Academy of Belgium for Science and the Arts, and a fellow of the American Statistical Association and the Institute of Mathematical Statistics.

References

External links

Year of birth missing (living people)
Living people
Belgian statisticians
Belgian mathematicians
Women statisticians
Belgian women mathematicians
Academic staff of KU Leuven
Elected Members of the International Statistical Institute
Fellows of the American Statistical Association
Fellows of the Institute of Mathematical Statistics